Greenwich is the name of two census-designated places in the U.S. state of New Jersey:

Greenwich (CDP), Cumberland County, New Jersey
Greenwich (CDP), Warren County, New Jersey